Marie Amachoukeli (born 16 July 1979), sometimes credited as Marie Amachoukeli-Barsacq, is a French film director and screenwriter of Georgian descent. Her directorial debut Party Girl competed in the Un Certain Regard section at the 2014 Cannes Film Festival and won the Camera d'Or.

Filmography

References

External links

1979 births
Living people
French women film directors
Film directors from Paris
French women screenwriters
French screenwriters
French people of Georgian descent
Directors of Caméra d'Or winners